Gubler may refer to:

 Adolphe-Marie Gubler (1821–1879), French physician and pharmacologist 
 Millard–Gubler syndrome
 Eduard Gubler (1891–1971), Swiss painter
 Matthew Gray Gubler (born 1980), American actor and fashion model
 Max Gubler (1898–1973), Swiss artist
 Nellie Gubler (1908–2007), Mormon historian
 Salomon Eduard Gubler (1845–1921), Swiss mathematician

See also
 Gubleria, a synonym of the Chilean bell flower Nolana
 Guler (disambiguation)

German toponymic surnames
Swiss-German surnames